The 1992 NAIA Division I women's basketball tournament  was the tournament held by the NAIA to determine the national champion of women's college basketball among its Division II members in the United States and Canada for the 1991–92 basketball season.

This was the first tournament held exclusively for Division II teams; a separate tournament was held concurrently for the teams the NAIA sorted into its Division I. 

Northern State (SD)  defeated Tarleton State in the championship game, 73–65, to claim the Wolves' first NAIA national title.

The tournament was played at the Physical Education Building at Western Oregon State College in Monmouth, Oregon.

Qualification

The tournament field for the inaugural Division II championship was set at 20 teams, a decrease of 12 teams from the last single-division NAIA tournament in 1991. The top eight teams received seeds, with the top four receiving a bye. The lowest ranked teams were placed in a preliminary first round. 

The tournament utilized a single-elimination format.

Bracket

See also
1992 NAIA Division II men's basketball tournament
1992 NCAA Division I women's basketball tournament
1992 NCAA Division II women's basketball tournament
1992 NCAA Division III women's basketball tournament
1992 NAIA Division I women's basketball tournament

References

NAIA
NAIA Women's Basketball Championships
1992 in sports in Oregon